Beltana (or Beltana Station) is a pastoral lease in the Australian state of South Australia which operates as a sheep station.

History
The area was first established for pastoralism by John Haimes in 1854 and then surveyed by John McDouall Stuart in 1855. In 1862 the property was acquired by Robert Barr Smith along with the flock of 17,705 sheep that the property was supporting.

Thomas Elder took over lease no. 370 in 1862 forming Beltana Station and until the early 20th century there were as many as 60 living on the station. Beltana Pastoral run for many years was the head station of the Beltana Pastoral Co. The station ran livestock, and a camel breeding programme for work on the Australian Overland Telegraph Line between Adelaide and Darwin, exploring and its own use. It provided living quarters for the "Afghan" cameleers who managed the camels.

21st century
On 26 April 2013, the land occupying the appropriate extent of the Beltana pastoral lease was gazetted by the Government of South Australia as a locality under the name Beltana Station.  The word "station" was added to the locality’s name to distinguish it from the bounded locality and the government town of Beltana.

The property holds up to 8,500 livestock and offers 4WD driving tracks and accommodation. Paul and Karen Ellis of Camel Treks Australia relocated to Beltana Station in 2018.

Heritage listing 
The historic Beltana Station Homestead is listed on the South Australian Heritage Register.

See also
List of ranches and stations

References

Stations (Australian agriculture)
Pastoral leases in South Australia
Far North (South Australia)